Jamie Sandy (born 18 January 1963) is an Australian former professional rugby league footballer who played in the 1980s.

Playing career

Brisbane Rugby League 
Jamie Sandy played as scrum half i.e. number 7 in Redcliffe Dolphins loss to Brisbane Brothers in the 1987 BRL Winfield Cup Grand Final.

Challenge Cup Final appearances
Jamie Sandy played , i.e. number 5, and scored a try in Castleford's 15-14 victory over Hull Kingston Rovers in the 1986 Challenge Cup Final during the 1985–86 season at Wembley Stadium, London on Saturday 3 May 1986.

References

External links
 Silk Cut Challenge Cup Final - Castleford v Hull Kingston Rovers
Jamie Sandy Memory Box Search at archive.castigersheritage.com

1963 births
Living people
Australian rugby league players
Castleford Tigers players
Eastern Suburbs Tigers players
Place of birth unknown
Redcliffe Dolphins players
Rugby league fullbacks
Rugby league wingers
Wests Panthers players